PAR1 may refer to:
 PAR1 (gene), Prader–Willi/Angelman region-1 gene
 PAR-1, a serine/threonine-protein kinase of the KIN2/PAR-1/MARK kinase family
 Coagulation factor II receptor
 Parchive, a data archive format
 PAR1, one of the pseudoautosomal regions of the X or Y chromosome